Baldo Petar Prokurica Prokurica (born July 2, 1958, in Vallenar) is a lawyer, academic, and politician of Croatian descent. He served as the Minister of National Defense of Chile since December 2020 and March 2022. He served as the Minister of Mining of Chile from 2018 to 2020. He is also a former Congressman and Senator of the Republic of Chile on behalf of District No. 3 for the Atacama Region. His family has Croatian origins. His primary studies were conducted at the College San Francisco de Vallenar and Seminary in La Serena. The side made in the Theological Seminary in La Serena and Santiago Scuola Italiana. His studies were conducted at the Faculty of Law, Catholic University of Chile.

References

1958 births
Living people
People from Vallenar
Chilean Ministers of Mining
Chilean people of Croatian descent
Pontifical Catholic University of Chile alumni
Members of the Senate of Chile
Members of the Chamber of Deputies of Chile
20th-century Chilean lawyers
21st-century Chilean lawyers
Chilean Ministers of Defense
National Renewal (Chile) politicians